Harbin Pharmaceutical Group Co., Ltd. (shortened to HPGC or Hayao) is a Chinese partially state-owned company engaged in the research & development, manufacture, and sale of pharmaceutical products. HPGC medication offerings include traditional Chinese medicine (TCM) and biopharmaceuticals; its main offerings include antibiotics, including amoxicillin and penicillin, and dietary supplements, including zinc gluconate and calcium gluconate.

The company owns both Renmintongtai, a drugstore chain and medical wholesaler for the domestic market, and GNC, a U.S.-based international retailer of supplements and wellness products.

History

In 2007, HPGC obtained approximately 73% and 14% of its total revenue from the sale of Western medicines and TCM preparations, respectively.

HPGC manufactures and distributes products for GNC China (known as ) under a joint venture, GNC (Shanghai) Food Technology Co., Ltd, formed in February 2019.

In February 2022, HPGC was stripped of its National Enterprise Technology Center status, a state designation for enterprises identified as capable of extraordinary technology innovation, by the National Development and Reform Commission after failing to meet the previous year's qualification requirements.

References

External links
 
 

Pharmaceutical companies of China
Companies based in Harbin
Chinese brands
Government-owned companies of China